Eleocharis palustris, the common spike-rush, creeping spike-rush or marsh spike-rush, is a species of mat-forming perennial flowering plants in the sedge family Cyperaceae. It grows in wetlands in Europe, North Africa, northern and central Asia (Siberia, China, Mongolia, Iran, Nepal, etc.) and North America (United States, Canada, Greenland, northern Mexico).  Eleocharis palustris is not easily distinguished from other closely related species and is extremely variable worldwide itself. The species epithet palustris is Latin for "of the marsh" and indicates its common habitat.

Subspecies and varieties
Numerous names have been proposed for subspecies and varieties. The following are recognized:

Eleocharis palustris subsp. iranica Kukkonen - Egypt, Turkey, Iran, Iraq, Afghanistan, Pakistan
Eleocharis palustris subsp. palustris - most of species range
Eleocharis palustris var. vigens L.H.Bailey - North America
Eleocharis palustris subsp. waltersii Bureš & Danihelka - Europe and Cyprus

References

palustris
Plants described in 1753
Taxa named by Carl Linnaeus
Flora of Europe
Flora of Asia
Flora of North Africa
Flora of North America